"Wedding Ring" is a song written by Stevie Wright and George Young. It was originally recorded by the Australian rock group the Easybeats in 1965, whose version reached #6 on the Australian charts.

Single track listing

Wedding Ring
Me Or You

Charts

The Sports version

Australia rock band The Sports released a version as the lead single from their extended play album, O.K, U.K!. The song peaked at number 40 on the Australian Kent Music Report.

Charts

Other Versions
In July 2018, The Screaming Jets released a version as the lead single from their eighth studio album Gotcha Covered.

References

1965 singles
1979 singles
2018 singles
1965 songs
The Easybeats songs
The Sports songs
The Screaming Jets songs
Songs written by Stevie Wright (Australian singer)
Songs written by Harry Vanda
Songs written by George Young (rock musician)
Parlophone singles
Mushroom Records singles
Albert Productions singles